Arnold Munnich (born 9 October 1949, in Paris), is a French paediatrician-geneticist. He is the creator and head of the department of medical genetics at the Necker-Enfants malades hospital in Paris. He was an advisor to the President of the Republic from 2007 to 2012 and a member of the Scientific Council of the AMMi Association.

Scientific background 
After a doctorate in medicine (1979) and a science thesis (1988) at the Institut Cochin in the U129 unit then headed by Axel Kahn, he was appointed Professor of Genetics at the University of Paris-Descartes in 1989. He has been head of the Inserm unit "Genetic handicaps of the child" since 1990, succeeding Jean Frézal, where he had done his clinic (1986-1990) at the Necker Hospital in Paris.

After Nicolas Sarkozy was elected President of the French Republic, Arnold Munnich was appointed Advisor to the President for Biomedical Research and Health.

Arnold Munnich has tried to use molecular genetics in paediatrics and to reconcile clinical and molecular genetics. He is the co-founder and current president of the Imagine Institute of Genetic Diseases and a member of the Scientific Council of the AMMi Association.

Distinctions 

    1994: Jean Hamburger Prize of the City of Paris
    1999: Jean-Pierre-Lecocq Prize from the French Academy of Sciences
    1999: Eloi-Collery Prize of the National Academy of Medicine
    2000: Grand Prix de l'Inserm
    2001: Jean Bernard Prize from the Fondation pour la recherche médicale
    2003: Member of the Institut Universitaire de France
    2004: Member of the French Academy of Sciences
    2007: Winner of the European Society of Human Genetics Award
    2009: Winner of the Gagna & Van Heck Award of the Belgian National Research Fund
    2012: Winner of the British Society of Human Genetics Carter Award
    2013: Officier of the Légion d'Honneur
    2014: Jean-Bernard Grand Prize of the City of Paris

A 2021 publication found Munnich to be a central researcher for describing rare genetic diseases.

Books 

    La Rage d'espérer. La génétique au quotidien, Plon Publishing, 1999
    Programmé mais libre, Plon Editions, 2016

He is the author or co-author of more than 700 scientific publications.

References

Living people
1949 births
French pediatricians
French geneticists
Nicolas Sarkozy
Members of the French Academy of Sciences